Clara Franco (San José de los Arroyos, Paraguay; September 25, 1977) is a Paraguayan actress, television host, comedian, impressionist, and singer in television and theater. She was part of the first entertainment program of Telefuturo called Casino Hotel, where her character "La Yuyera" was born.

She was in almost all the programs on Telefuturo, was featured on other channels, and she performed many theatrical works, such as Divas Vs. Divus, Risaterapia seasons 1, 2 and 3.

Career 
Clara Franco began her career debuting on Argentine TV as part of a crew of comic actors directed by Leonardo Bechini in the series Cazados.

She had studied recital and theater since she was 3 years old. She formed a folkloric duo with her sister Montserrat. Currently, Franco is the vocalist of the Caiobá group. Beyond acting on Telefuturo, in the Telecomio program she was a comedian, along with actor Walter Evers and Gustavo Cabaña.

In 2015 she participated in singing competitions on the show Parodiando (Paraguay) where she parodied El Monchi Papá, Adele, Ana Gabriel, Paquita la del barrio and others. She also danced in Baila Conmigo Paraguay with her dance and theater partner Gustavo Cabaña, and she won.

She was also in other programs like Shoping del Humor, Claricaturas, Cantando por un Sueño, Matrimonios y algo mas, Tu dia de suerte, and Baila Conmigo Paraguay. Short films and national films are also in her repertoire.

Characters 

 La Yuyera
 Ña Armi
 Ronchi
 Hugo Eusebio

References

External links 
 

21st-century Paraguayan women singers
Paraguayan television actresses
Impressionists (entertainers)
1977 births
Living people
Paraguayan stage actresses
People from Caaguazú Department
21st-century Paraguayan actresses